South Korean boy band BTS was formed in 2010 and debuted in 2013. The septet has had a significant cultural impact both in Korea and internationally, and is considered one of the leading figures of the Hallyu wave in the 21st century. The commercial influence of BTS upon the Korean economy, along with their philanthropic and other commercial ventures, has received extensive attention in the press and in financial markets.

Cultural impact

Internationally, BTS have been described as "easily the biggest and most successful name in K-pop in the world" that can "do things no other name in their genre can", with Time giving them the nickname "Princes of Pop". Billboards Senior Vice President Silvio Pietroluongo said that BTS are comparable to and as influential as the Beatles and the Monkees. Nielsen Music Vice President Helena Kosinski said that "although BTS weren't the first to open the doors to K-Pop worldwide, they were the first to become mainstream. They don't just appeal to young people but also to the 50s and 60s age demographic."

In 2019, BTS were again named as one of the top 10 Global Recording Artists of the Year by IFPI, for a second time, ranking number 7. In 2020, BTS became the first non-English artist to be named IFPI's #1 Global Recording Artist of the Year. In 2021,BTS became the first Act to be named IFPI’s #1 Global Recording Artist of the Year two years in a row.  In November 2019, Billboard ranked BTS fourth on their Top Social Artist of the 2010s list, making them the highest group on the list. BTS was also ranked No. 45 on Billboard'''s Top Touring Artists of the 2010s list. They are the highest-ranked Asian act on the list, as well as the only non-English speaking act.

BTS have been often regarded as "the biggest boy band in the world". They have also appeared in various power listings. The most tweeted-about celebrities in the world from 2017 to 2020, the group was included in Time's list of the 25 most influential people on the internet from 2017 to 2019, featured on the magazine's October 2018 international edition cover as "Next Generation Leaders," and were listed as one of Time 100's most influential people in 2019. After BTS released their single "Idol," the National Gugak Center had to expand the amount of Korean instrument sounds available due to increased demand from Korean and foreign producers alike.

BTS also appeared in Bloomberg Markets 50 most influential in 2018. In 2019, BTS ranked 43rd on Forbes' annual list of the 100 highest-paid celebrities with earnings of $57 million. BTS also ranked first on the list of 'Top Rank Global Sustainable Future Leaders' during an announcement from the UN-sponsored SDG association at the United Nations headquarters, while BTS' fanclub, ARMY, were noted as the 'Top Rank Sustainable Global group'. Other notable people included in this list were Malala Yousafzai and Bill Gates.

The group's influence has led them to address the United Nations at their 73rd General Assembly and to perform before 400 officials including South Korean president Moon Jae-in at the 2018 Korea-France Friendship Concert in Paris, a summit meant to show the friendly relations between France and South Korea. Moon Hee-sang, Speaker of the National Assembly, said that "BTS is doing most of our work," attributing the results of his overseas trip to the credit of the global group on an overseas trip to promote "sales diplomacy".

BTS hold twenty-three Guinness World Records.

Asia

When the BTS McDonald's meal was released in Indonesia it caused McDonald's restaurants to close due to the breaking of COVID regulations because of the influx of customers. In October 2019, BTS performed at King Fahd International Stadium in Riyadh, becoming the first foreign act to perform a solo concert in Saudi Arabia. In 2020, BTS was the most streamed artist overall in Vietnam.

 China 

Although there were THAAD restrictions starting in 2016 that blocked the sales of South Korean items in China, BTS fan clubs were still able to break the record for the most albums purchased at one time. The fan clubs ordered through surrogate shoppers to get around the mandate.

BTS have often been used for political purposes in China due to their popularity. In 2020 during a speech member RM made at the Korea Society for promoting U.S.-Korean relations, he stated, "“We will always remember the history of pain that our two nations shared together and the sacrifices of countless men and women.” The Chinese Communist Party used his statement for political purpose, using newspapers controlled by the party to point out he did not mention the lives China lost when backing the North. BTS related items began getting pulled from stores in China as a result. The attack lasted less than two days before the press began to quietly redact the statements they put out due to backlash.

 India 
President Ram Nath Kovind mentioned BTS in 2018 at an official banquet, stating, “Korean popular culture has also charmed us. From "Gangnam Style" to Korea's band 'BTS', our youth are captivated by the tunes of these iconic pop groups...." According to The Indian Express, during the COVID-19 pandemic a Korean wave swept up India with BTS, along with popular Korean dramas Crash Landing on You and Squid Game, leading the curve.

 Japan 
BTS began the third Korean wave in Japan despite diplomatic difficulties between the two countries. With BTS and girl group Twice in the lead, it went from a subculture to main stream. In 2018 the Japanese boy group King & Prince debuted, their agency stating the group was modeled after BTS due to their popularity. In 2019, the group Ballistik Boyz debuted who were modeled after BTS as well. In 2021, Rakuten Group did a survey to find which country's fashion is the most influential in Japan. Men in their teens and twenties named BTS as the second most popular fashion influence, beat only by Takuya Kimura. During the 2020 Summer Olympics BTS was played during some of the sporting events.

BTS broke Oricon's record and became the first artist to achieve over 10 million streams during a single week for at least three songs. BTS are the second foreign singers to reach number one on Oricon album charts, the first being Michael Jackson. They are also the first Korean album to hit number one on the Oricon chart. Map of the Soul: 7 – The Journey set new album records for the highest first day sales by both a foreigner and a Korean artist in Japan. With their album BTS, the Best, they became the first Korean group to sell one million copies of an album and it went on to become the best selling album of the year within a single day of sales. Their single "MIC Drop/DNA/Crystal Snow” is the highest ranking song by a Korean artist on the yearly Oricon chart ever achieved and "Butter" became the fastest song to receive platinum certification in history for the chart.

In 2018, BTS and girl group Twice were invited to perform at popular show Kōhaku Uta Gassen. Both appearances were cancelled without warning, citing afterwards it was because of BTS member Jimin wearing a T-shirt that depicted the atomic bomb detonating, among text celebrating Korea's liberation from Japanese rule during World War II. It was questioned why the ban was only happening now, as the incident happened in 2017 and BTS were allowed to perform in December 2017 at Japan Music Station Super Live. At a later date, it was revealed they were banned due to political reasons because the Korean supreme court ruled that Japan's Nippon Steel & Sumitomo Metal Corp. needed to compensate four Koreans for forced labor during wartimes. A member of BTS, RM, had also tweeted about Korea's liberation day from Japan at that time adding to the fodder.

 North Korea 
Despite strict crack downs on K-pop, BTS have been experiencing popularity with the North Korean youth. If the contraband is found, an individual could face five to fifteen years in prison. A private source stated their popularity was due to BTS' meaningful lyrics that tell listeners to 'love themselves'. In 2020, North Korean soldiers were caught partying while listening to "Blood Sweat & Tears". In order to combat their growing popularity, government propaganda was created calling Korean groups like BTS 'slaves' and that they 'suffer miserable lives'. North Korean high schoolers were still caught listening to BTS after the mandate.

 South Korea 
BTS accounted for 41.9 percent of album sales in the first half of 2019, up from their market share of 25.3 percent the previous year. According to a JoyNews24 'Power People of 2019' survey among industry professionals, BTS was chosen as number 1 with 74 votes, with number 2 being Parasite Director Bong Joon-ho with 29 votes. BTS topped the list of Forbes Korea Power Celebrity in 2018, 2020, 2021, and 2022. They ranked fifth in 2017 and second in 2019. In December 2019, according to the annual survey conducted by Gallup Korea, BTS were the most preferred artists of 2019 for a second consecutive year. The septet were the first artist not from a "Big Three" entertainment company (SM, YG and JYP) to win Artist of the Year at the 18th Mnet Asian Music Awards in December.

Celebrating Korean music icon Seo Taiji's 25th anniversary as a part of his anniversary project "Time: Traveler", BTS released a remake of Seo Taiji's 1995 classic "Come Back Home" in July 2017, reworking the sound and lyrics to similar sentiments toward societal change that Seo Taiji argued for in his songs. BTS was later invited by Seo Taiji to perform as backup vocalists and dancers for eight songs in his Seoul Olympic Stadium concert held early September. During the concert, Seo Taiji acknowledged BTS' thematic similarities to his music and recognized the group as his musical successors, declaring, "This is your generation now. Show them." 

Kang Soojung, exhibition manager at the Museum of Modern and Contemporary Art, said that while preparing the 50th anniversary exhibition called "Square", she was greatly influenced by BTS' hidden track "Sea". BTS appeared on You Quiz on the Block, a South Korean variety show program, where they broke the show's rating records for viewership in March 2021. It was announced in 2021 that k-pop group Blitzers were modeled after BTS. Congresswoman Ryu Ho-jeong used pictures of member Jeon Jungkook showing his tattoos in order to help decriminalize tattoos as they are illegal in the country.

In September 2019, president Moon Jae-in also mentioned BTS in his announcement for his '3 major innovation strategies for the contents industry', stating that BTS has pioneered innovative business models that communicate directly with fans. In October 2019, The Ministry of Culture, Sports and Tourism selected BTS as a recipient for a 'Letter of Appreciation', for showing the world the beauty of Korean traditional culture (Hangul, Hanbok, Gugak) through creative re-interpretations in their music. According to the "2019 South Korean National Image" survey conducted by the Ministry of Culture, Sports and Tourism and its affiliate the Korean Culture and Information Service among 16 countries, BTS were chosen number 2 with 5.5% votes. Despite cultural medals traditionally being given to recipients with more than 15 years of notable achievements, BTS became the youngest ever recipients honored with the Order of Cultural Merit by the President of South Korea in 2018, five years after debuting, due to their noteworthy contributions in spreading Korean culture and language. In 2020, they were again honored as the youngest ever recipients (and only musician in the award's history) to receive the James A. Van Fleet Award, in recognition of their outstanding contributions to the promotion of U.S.-Korea relations. At the end of the year the "BTS Law" was passed by Korean congressmen allowing BTS to put off their mandated military service until they reach thirty years of age instead of twenty-eight.

On July 21, 2021, President Moon Jae-in appointed BTS as Special Presidential Envoy for Future Generations and Culture. The appointment is aimed to "raise awareness on global agendas, such as sustainable development, to our future generations and to strengthen the nation's diplomatic power across the world". The group will represent South Korea at various international events, such as the 76th United Nations General Assembly.

 Philippines 
Congressman Alan Peter Cayetano made a "BTS sa Kongreso" (BTS in Congress) bloc with six other congressmen to bring awareness to a Charter Change he wanted implemented. Cayetano called it a success despite the backlash he received, as it went viral and a percentage of the BTS fans supported it. A study completed by iPrice Group in the Philippines found that searches for a brand BTS endorses can more than double after a collaboration, with brands like Coca-Cola and Louis Vuitton growing by 127% and 65%, respectively. In 2021, images of Jungkook were posted by John Geesnell Yap, the mayor of Tagbilaran, to convince citizens to receive the COVID shot.

 Europe 
BTS are the first Asian musical act to get a number one album in Germany. In June 2020, a bi-monthly magazine dedicated solely to BTS was released in Italy reflecting their popularity. In 2016, BTS became the first Korean artist to enter the Official Albums Chart with their album Wings in the UK, and in 2021 became the most nominated Korean artist at the MTV Europe Music Awards. They also hold the record for the K-Pop act with the most top 10 hits on the UK Singles Chart. Oli London, a British influencer, got eighteen surgeries costing up to £150k to look like member Jimin. They are the first Korean group to sell out and perform at Wembley Stadium and the first Korean artist to be nominated at the Brit Awards.

North America
 Canada 
In Canada, BTS are the second highest Asian act to chart on the Canada CHR/Top Forty peaking at number six with "Butter", beat only by Psy's "Gangnam Style" which hit number two. They also hold the record for the longest charting song by a Korean artist, spending twenty-eight weeks on the Canadian Hot 100 with "Dynamite".

 Mexico 
During the 2018 FIFA World Cup, Mexico streamed BTS and began playing their songs on the radio to thank South Korea for defeating Germany as it inadvertently kept them in the World Cup. When the BTS McDonald's meal was released, fans were in line hours before stores were opened, with many waiting up to two hours to get a meal. Within a few hours on the first day, all  stores ran out of the special packaging for the meal.

 United States 

BTS became the first K-pop group to receive their own Twitter emoji in May 2016. As the first non-English speaking artist to make the Global Artist Chart in 2018, BTS had the second and third best-selling albums worldwide and were the second best-selling artists worldwide in terms of physical, digital, and streaming platforms, coming second only to Drake. BTS accounted for 72.7 percent of the album consumption units generated by K-pop acts in 2018 out of a total of 17 acts. The group was also listed as one of the most influential artists of the decade by CNN, for "popularizing K-pop in the US". They were named 2019 Hitmakers Group of the Year by Variety in 2019.

In California, BTS inspired a teacher to have his school be the first in the country to offer a Korean American Culture and Society course. American production companies began moving to bring aspects of K-pop idols to the music industry, particularly the reality competitions to create idol groups. Aja Romano of Vox stated it was likely a direct result of BTS's influence on the industry. In October 2021, it was announced twenty-six Korean words would be added to the Oxford English Dictionary. It was noted that BTS, along with the popular Korean franchises Squid Game and Parasite, helped make the words well known.  In 2021, a marked growth of Korea's influence in the United States was noted, jumping up thirteen places from the year before ranking fifteenth overall for the year. This was attributed to BTS' growing influence in the country. Because of this, BTS began to be called one of South Korea's soft power's in politics.

BTS became the first K-pop act to remain atop the Billboard World Albums for multiple weeks. They also became the first Korean group to top the Billboard Social 50 chart. They spent 210 weeks total at number one before it was put in hiatus in December 2020 and are the first-ever musical act to chart over 200 weeks on it. BTS hold the record for highest charting Korean song in the US with "Life Goes On" hitting number one on the Billboard Hot 100 chart. They also hold the record for highest charting non-English song. They hold the record for highest charting Japanese song with"Film Out" hitting number one on the Billboard Global 200 and highest charting Japanese album BTS, the Best hitting number nineteen on the Billboard 200. The band are also the first Korean artist to reach number one on the Billboard Hot 100 chart. BTS are the first to have three number one albums in a year on the Billboard 200 since the Beatles.

BTS have won various awards in the United States. They are the first Asian to be nominated and win Best Artist at the American Music Awards and first all Korean band  to perform at the Grammy Awards and to receive a nomination. They were the first Korean group to win a Billboard Music Award as well. Esquire called BTS one of the top ten best bands of all time, ranked with others such as The Supremes, Destiny's Child, and Queen.Love Yourself: Answer became the first Korean album to earn gold certification in 2018, and in 2020 Map of the Soul: 7 became first Korean album to earn platinum. The most-decorated Korean act by the RIAA, they're the first Korean act to amass over a billion streams and the first to hit five billion streams on Spotify as well. In 2018, BTS became the first-ever Korean artist to perform at a stadium in the United States after performing at Citi Field. They are the first Asian act to sell out the Rose Bowl. Their Rose Bowl concerts are the single highest-grossing engagement in the venue's Boxscore history, out-pacing previous high marks by Taylor Swift and U2, as well as co-headlining stints by Beyoncé & Jay-Z and Eminem & Rihanna.

 South America 
 Argentina 
A Hallyu wave began in Argentina during 2021, with BTS, Squid Game, and Korean food leading the front. In June 2021, the Centro Cultural Coreano (CCC) (Korean Cultural Center) in Argentina announced that it would host a Latin American K-pop contest inspired by BTS. It is one of the largest contests to be inspired by BTS as it encompasses several countries from a large region, including groups from Argentina, Bolivia, Brazil, Cuba, Ecuador, Guatemala, Mexico, Paraguay, among other countries.

 Chile 
When BTS held concerts in Chile back in 2017 their concert sold out in a record breaking two hours despite no advertisements for the show. They also became the fastest K-pop group to sell out the Movistar Arena, Chile's largest indoor arena. Jeff Benjamin from  The New York Times stated BTS are so popular that they do not bother to advertise anything they do. Fans will wait in line a week ahead to have a chance to get BTS tickets.

Legacy
BTS' work has influenced numerous artists, including (G)I-dle, D-Crunch's Hyunho, The Boyz' Younghoon and Hwall, SF9's Zuho, Euna Kim, Golden Child's Jaehyun, Wanna One, IN2IT, Park Ji-hoon, Kim Dong-han, Seven O'Clock, Hyeongseop X Euiwoong, Noir, Victon's Sejun and Byungchan, Loona, Newkidd, and Enhypen.

K-pop idol groups began changing the themes of their lyrics from love stories to words such as "looking for myself" following BTS' "Love Yourself" era and RM's speech at the United Nations. Their success on the global pop market kicked off a new trend among Korean bands, with a growing number of idols, including Monsta X and Stray Kids, starting to present more personal messages when writing lyrics. Some artists have published conceptual trilogies, built imaginary worlds around their music, and shown greater propensity for darker themes after noticing BTS' success with doing the same. Various countries have tried to replicate making bands similar to BTS, including South Korea, Japan, and the United States.

Commercial influence 

In 2019, BTS had been estimated to have revitalized the Korean music industry and have a 1-2% effect upon the entire Korean economy, in addition to its international influences. Credited for the surge in popularity of online purchases of K-pop items and the growth of the Korean Wave between 2016 and 2018 by the Korea Customs Service and Korea Foundation, BTS were cited as one of the main driving forces for the recovery of South Korea's music-related sector to levels seen before China's 2016 ban on domestic cultural contents over soured diplomatic relations. Yung Duk Kim, vice president and chief operating officer of the Korea Creative Content Agency, stated K-pop has "skyrocketed" since BTS' popularity surged, creating jobs not only for BTS and their team but other K-pop idols as well. Various news outlets coined the term the "BTS effect" to refer to the commercial effects of BTS' influence, such as when KB Kookmin Bank savings accounts increased six-fold compared to the prior year following BTS' endorsement and when stock prices of entertainment companies in South Korea shot up for five days after BTS topped the U.S. Billboard 200. The effect was also observed when companies tied to BTS, such as Netmarble, NetMark, Soribada, Key Shares, GMP, Diffie, and Mattel had their stocks rise. In October 2019, Mattel's international gross sales rose 10% to $721.7 million, lifted by sales of dolls based on BTS. Data firm SM2 Networks estimated Hyundai Motor received KR₩600 billion ($502 million) in promotional results after commissioning BTS as their promotional models in 2018. The Bank of Korea Economic Statistics System stated that South Korea's BOP for music and entertainment reached $114.7 million in the first quarter of 2019, attributing this to an improved relationship between China and South Korea, and the breakout global success of BTS, particularly in North America.

Signed on as tourism ambassadors in 2017, the Seoul Metropolitan Government credits BTS for the recovery of Seoul's shrinking tourism industry following the 2016 THAAD controversy, bringing in an average of 790,000 tourists to Korea annually. In December 2018, the Hyundai Research Institute estimated that BTS were worth more than $3.67 billion to the Korean economy each year, attracting one in every thirteen foreigners who visited Korea. BTS' two day fan-meetings held in Seoul and Busan in June 2019 generated a total economic effect of ₩481 billion ($408 million) to both cities, accounting for 1.6% of Busan's 2018 GDP, and 0.9% of Seoul's 2018 GDP. Their three-day concert finale in Seoul for their Love Yourself World Tour in October 2019 was estimated to have an economic value of almost ₩1 trillion ($862 million) and brought in 187,000 foreign visitors to South Korea. , BTS' economic effect on South Korea is estimated to be over ₩5.5 trillion ($4.65 billion) per year, about 0.3% of South Korea's GDP. This is comparable to Korean Air, the flagship airline of South Korea, whose percent contribution to South Korea's GDP is 0.7%. The 2019 annual ticket sales data released by the Korean online ticketing site, Interpark revealed that BTS' world tour "Love Yourself: Speak Yourself" concert at the Seoul Olympic Stadium ranked No.1, with BTS topping the ticket sales for the second consecutive year on Interpark. Outside of South Korea, BTS' concerts at Wembley Stadium were estimated to have brought around ₩100 billion ($82 million) as a direct economic effect to the city of London. After BTS went to Malta for their show, 'Bon Voyage 3', the Malta Tourism Authority reported a 237% increase of Korean tourists visiting the country, crediting BTS as the reason for the increase. Along with Ariana Grande and Drake, BTS were credited as a key act boosting global music sales to $19 billion in 2018. Such profit had not been seen since 2006 after digital purchases gained momentum. In 2020, a joint report by the Ministry of Culture, Sports and Tourism and Korea Culture and Tourism Institute estimated an economic effect of ₩1.7 trillion ($1.43 billion) to be created by BTS' entry at number one in the Billboard Hot 100 chart with "Dynamite". BTS were again credited as one of the acts that helped boost global music industry revenues to $21.6 billion in 2020, the highest figure since 2002.Forbes Korea named BTS the most influential celebrities of Korea in 2018 and 2020, and BTS ranked 43rd in the Forbes Celebrity 100 (2019) as one of the world's top-earning celebrities. As of 2019, BTS is purportedly worth more than US$4.65 billion to South Korea's economy each year, or 0.3 percent of the country's GDP. They attract one in every 13 foreign tourists who visited South Korea and were cited as one of the key acts in boosting global music sales to $19 billion in 2018.

Starting in 2020, BTS's management company Big Hit Entertainment listed publicly as part of Hybe Co., Ltd, which became valued at $9.5 billion USD in 2022. In March 2020, Big Hit Entertainment launched a video series, "Learn Korean with BTS", on the social media app Weverse, intended to "make it easy and fun for global fans who have difficulty enjoying BTS' music and contents due to the language barrier." The idea for the project emerged in reaction to fans asking for English subtitles for BTS' videos. The series consists of thirty three-minute lessons on Korean expressions and grammar using footage from existing BTS content on YouTube and VLive, such as "Run BTS!" and "Bangtan Bomb." The videos were developed in collaboration with experts at the Korean Language Content Institute and Hankuk University of Foreign Studies.

 BTS Universe 

The BTS Universe, also known as the Bangtan Universe or BU, is an alternate universe created by Big Hit Entertainment that winds through the group's output. The webtoon Save Me closely follows the story line, along with their book HYYH: The Notes 1. The chronology of the universe began with the song "I Need U" and spans to the present time. It tells the story of the seven members in an alternate reality and depicts their anxieties and uncertainties as they confront their futures. In a corporate briefing held on February 4, 2020, Big Hit also announced the upcoming release of its sequel HYYH: The Notes 2, the recreation of five BTS songs into five picture books, and the upcoming drama Youth to be produced in collaboration with Chorokbaem Media and renowned screenwriter Kim Soo-jin. Speaking to Billboard, Michelle Cho, an assistant professor of East Asian Popular Cultures at the University of Toronto, said "As an audio-visual experience, "I Need U" inaugurated the Bangtan Universe—the coming-of-age storyline that brilliantly integrates the Most Beautiful Moment in Life [album] trilogy and continues in music videos, "concept videos" (mini-films), and the multiform, open-ended narrative that's been serialized in album liner notes and Twitter and Instagram posts."

Mariejo Ramos from The Inquirer said about the universe "no other artists have successfully mixed the same literary technique to pop music in such a scale." They used the alternate universe and literary books, such as The Ones Who Walk Away from Omelas, as a framing device for their albums. Mixing the two has created an interactive environment for their fans who make theories when new material or hints are released.

It was announced in 2021 the drama Youth would be released. It will encapsulate the story line created throughout the BU and Save Me webtoon.

Endorsements
Several commercial endorsements made by BTS over the years have had significant cultural impact due to the high visibility of marketing and advertisement campaigns. BTS have maintained numerous global endorsement deals in various industries throughout their career. Partnered with Puma since 2015, BTS initially promoted its sportswear as Puma Korea's brand ambassadors before expanding to become global ambassadors in 2018 and promoting the remix of Puma's "Turin" and "Sportstyle" line worldwide. In 2019, BTS signed with Fila to endorse its sportswear. BTS has also served as global brand ambassadors for LG Electronics' 2018 LG G7 ThinQ telephone, and for Hyundai Motors' 2019 flagship SUV the "Palisade" and hydrogen fuel cell electric SUV, the "Nexo". Due to BTS' endorsement, Hyundai received almost double the anticipated domestic order volume for the Palisade. BTS became global ambassadors of the electric street racing series Formula E to promote how electric vehicles can help combat climate change. In 2020, BTS partnered with Samsung Electronics on a limited edition BTS-themed version of the Galaxy S20+ and Galaxy Buds+. As the first male pop group ever to collaborate with Dior, BTS sported ensembles from Kim Jones' Pre-Fall 2019 collection at their concert at Stade de France. In April 2021, BTS were chosen as Louis Vuitton brand ambassadors. 

In the entertainment sector, BTS published the webtoons Hip Hop Monster and We On through the Nate Webtoon portal and Save Me in collaboration with LICO and Line Webtoon. In the toy industry, Mattel created dolls modeled off BTS' outfits from the music video "Idol", Medicom Toy created the "BE@RBRICK", a block-like toy featuring the BTS logo and accents modeled after BTS' stage clothes, and Funko released BTS versions of Funko Pops. BTS also partnered with popular Korean communication app Line, to create new Line 'characters' called BT21. The collaboration initially produced emojis and electronic stickers, but later expanded to include fashion apparel, footwear, accessories, and other merchandise. Line flagship stores opened throughout Seoul before spreading across the global market into Japan, Taiwan, Hong Kong and the United States. The BTS characters also partnered with popular game Among Us to create limited edition characters that will be available worldwide. In March 2023, Lego released the "Lego Ideas BTS Dynamite set".

In the gaming industry, Nexon released character avatars based on BTS for their RPG game Elsword, and BTS worked with DalcomSoft to release the rhythm game Superstar BTS in January 2018, as well as with Netmarble Games for the story-based, mobile simulation game BTS World released in June 2019. In December 2020, BTS collaborated with MapleStory, to design their own special in-game items inspired by their favorite MapleStory childhood memories. BTS have also collaborated with Casetify to globally launch a new tech accessory collection and ceramics company Kwangjuyo to release a BTS-themed line of ceramics. In February 2022, online game developer, and publisher, Garena announced BTS as the global ambassadors for the mobile game, Free Fire''. In the food industry, BTS collaborated with McDonald's to launch the BTS Meal which was available in 50 countries. BTS partnered with Baskin-Robbins Korea to launch limited-edition cakes and ice cream flavors. Snickers released limited-edition chocolate bars with purple packaging that featured BTS song titles.

In Asia, BTS have worked as brand spokespersons for KB Kookmin Bank, one of the four largest banks in South Korea. Their collaboration generated the opening of over 180,000 accounts, and BTS extended their contract with KB Kookmin Bank through 2019. Coca-Cola Korea signed BTS on as their new campaign models for promotions during the 2018 World Cup in Russia. In 2021, BTS participated in Coca-Cola's global campaign "Turn Up the Rhythm". In the tourism sector, BTS have worked as brand models for Lotte Duty Free Shop since 2017 and as honorary tourism ambassadors for Seoul as part of the 'I Seoul U' program. In the beauty and apparel industry, BTS maintained a relationship with uniform brand SMART from 2016 to 2019. BTS have also promoted the face mask brand Mediheal, the cosmetics brand VT Cosmetics, the contact lens brand Play/Up, vitamin supplement brand Lemona, Indonesian e-commerce company Tokopedia, massage chair brand Bodyfriend, Philippine telecommunications company, Smart Communications and Lotte Chilsung's Kloud Draft beer.

References

BTS
2010s in music
2020s in music
BTS
BTS